Progress is a Russian (formerly Soviet) research station in Antarctica.  It is located at the Larsemann Hills antarctic oasis on the shore of Prydz Bay.

The station was established by the 33rd Soviet Antarctic Expedition on April 1, 1988, and was moved to another place on February 26, 1989  In 2000, work was temporarily halted but it reopened in 2003.

A landing field is located close to the station for air connection with other stations.  From 1998 to 2001 works were performed to transfer transportation operations to Progress from the Mirny Station and make it the main support base for Vostok station.

In 2004, work began on a year-round facility at the station.  On October 4, 2008, a fire broke out at the construction site resulting in the death of a construction worker and two serious injuries.  The fire resulted in the complete loss of the new structure, as well as damage to the station's communications and scientific equipment.

In 2013, the construction of a new wintering complex was completed. It is a residential unit with a sauna and gym, rooms for meteorologists and radio operators, a medical care unit which doubles as a regional hospital, and its own galley.

In 2022, the wintering complex was modernized and enlarged. An additional adjacent airfield, complementing the pre-existing Progress Skiway and called Zenit after the St. Petersburg football club, was built from scratch and features a runway of 3,000 meters length and 100 meters width, which is also able to accommodate larger planes such as the Ilyushin IL-76.

Climate

See also

 List of Antarctic research stations
 List of Antarctic field camps
 Airports in Antarctica

References

External links
 Official website Arctic and Antarctic Research Institute
 AARI Progress Station page website, contains photos and climatological data since 1989
 COMNAP Antarctic Facilities
 COMNAP Antarctic Facilities Map

Buildings and structures completed in 1988
Meteorological stations
Outposts of Antarctica
Russia and the Antarctic
Soviet Union and the Antarctic
Outposts of Princess Elizabeth Land
1988 establishments in Antarctica